Yury Nikolayevich Lukashov (born 29 December 1974 in Mozyr) is a Belarusian professional football coach and a former player. In 2014, he became a Dnepr Mogilev head coach, after working in the club as assistant and reserves coach for several years.

Honours
MPKC Mozyr
Belarusian Premier League champion: 1996

Dnepr-Transmash Mogilev
Belarusian Premier League champion: 1998

References

External links
 Profile at Pressball.by
 Profile at teams.by
 

Living people
1974 births
Belarusian footballers
Association football midfielders
FC Dnepr Mogilev players
FC Slavia Mozyr players
FC Fandok Bobruisk players
FC Shakhtyor Soligorsk players
FC Neman Grodno players
Belarusian football managers
FC Dnepr Mogilev managers